Lichnoptera moesta  is a species of moth of the family Noctuidae. It is found in South America including Venezuela.

References

Pantheinae
Moths described in 1858